The first season of The Fresh Prince of Bel-Air premiered on September 10, 1990 and concluded on May 6, 1991. In the pilot, Will Smith is revealed to be a street-smart teenager from West Philadelphia, who is sent to live with his wealthy relatives at their Bel Air, Los Angeles mansion. His relatives include Phillip Banks, Will's strict and gruff uncle, and Vivian Banks, Will's no-nonsense, forthright, and career-minded aunt. Other members of the Banks family include Carlton Banks, Will's preppy and arrogant cousin, Hilary Banks, Will's attractive but dumb, eldest cousin, Ashley Banks, Will's youngest cousin, and Geoffrey, the family's cynical English Butler. Will's lifestyle often clashes with that of his relatives there, and frequently got him or other members of the family into trouble as well.

Episodes 

 Will Smith, James Avery, Janet Hubert-Whitten, Alfonso Ribeiro, Karyn Parsons, Tatyana M. Ali, and Joseph Marcell were present for all episodes.
 DJ Jazzy Jeff was present for eight episodes, including pre-filmed footage in one episode.

Cast
 Will Smith as William "Will" Smith (25 episodes, 1990-1991)
 James Avery as Philip Banks (25 episodes, 1990-1991)
 Janet Hubert as Vivian Banks (5 episodes, 1990)
 Janet Hubert-Whitten as Vivian Banks (20 episodes, 1990-1991)
 Alfonso Ribeiro as Carlton Banks (25 episodes, 1990-1991)
 Karyn Parsons as Hilary Banks (25 episodes, 1990-1991)
 Tatyana M. Ali as Ashley Banks (25 episodes, 1990-1991)
 Joseph Marcell as Geoffrey Butler (25 episodes, 1990-1991)

Guest cast
 DJ Jazzy Jeff as Jazz (9 episodes, 1990-1991)
 Vernee Watson-Johnson as Viola (2 episodes, 1990)

References

External links 
 
 

1990 American television seasons
1991 American television seasons
The Fresh Prince of Bel-Air seasons